Rainer Candidus Barzel (20 June 1924 – 26 August 2006) was a German politician of the Christian Democratic Union (CDU). He served as the 8th President of the Bundestag from 1983 to 1984.

Barzel had been the leader of his parliamentary group and a short time federal minister, before his party went into opposition in 1969. Subsequently, Barzel became chairman of the party. He tried to become federal chancellor via a constructive vote of no confidence 1972, being the first one in the Federal Republic to have tried so. He unexpectedly came two votes short. In the subsequent general elections of November 1972, he was the unsuccessful main candidate of the CDU/CSU. He lost his chairmanship the year after but remained an influential member of the parliament.

Biography
Born in Braunsberg, East Prussia (present-day Braniewo, Poland), Barzel served as Chairman of the CDU from 1971 to 1973 and ran as the CDU's candidate for Chancellor of Germany in the 1972 federal elections, losing to Willy Brandt's SPD.

Barzel served as Minister of All-German Affairs (1962–63) under Konrad Adenauer, as Parliamentary group leader of the CDU/CSU (1964–1973), as Minister of Intra-German Relations (1982–1983) in Helmut Kohl's cabinet, and as President of the Bundestag (1983–1984).

The 1972 election is commonly regarded as an indirect referendum on Chancellor Brandt's Ostpolitik (Eastern Policy), which called for normalized relations with East Germany and the Soviet Union, which Barzel vehemently opposed. On 27 April 1972 Barzel and the CDU/CSU called a constructive vote of no confidence against Brandt's government. Had the motion carried, Barzel would have succeeded Brandt as Chancellor of Germany. The implications of this vote were far-reaching. Brandt's initial reaction was that he, along with his policy of Ostpolitik, was finished. Several German trade unions went on strike in anticipation of his loss in the no confidence motion. However, the final tally received 247 votes; 249 were needed to expel Brandt from office. Persuasive evidence subsequently emerged that two members of Parliament,  (CDU) and Leo Wagner (CSU) had been bribed by the East German Ministry for State Security.   Details of the alleged East German involvement remain hazy, however:  not all commentators are persuaded that East German bribes were the most decisive factor in the tantalisingly narrow failure of the no-confidence vote which, had matters turned out differently, could have triggered a successful bid for Barzel to become West Germany's next chancellor in 1972.

The government, in consideration of the fact that it had lost its effective parliamentary majority and that parliamentary work was stalled, reacted by deliberately losing a vote of confidence, which then allowed the President of Germany, Gustav Heinemann to dissolve the Bundestag and call early elections, which Brandt and the SPD handily won.  1972 was the only time between the war and German reunification that saw the SPD place first in a federal German election, and it still represents the SPD's high-water mark as a vote share. That year's elections had the highest turnout of any German federal election at 91.1%, one of the highest turnouts ever recorded in national elections without mandatory voting.

Within the CDU group of the German parliament, Barzel's credibility suffered when it became apparent that he had lied about substantial outside income from work as a lawyer outside parliament.

It was neither the lost no-confidence motion nor the lost parliamentary elections that, on 8 May 1973, eventually prompted Barzel to resign from both the CDU party chair and the leadership of the CDU/CSU parliamentary group. It was the refusal by the parliamentary group to support a government bill for the accession of both German states to the United Nations.

In 1982, Barzel married the political scientist Helga Henselder-Barzel.

He resigned from politics in 1984 after he was accused of being entangled in the Flick affair, a charge rejected by the Flick inquiry committee and the prosecuting authorities two years later.

Barzel died in Munich, Bavaria, after a long illness, on 26 August 2006, aged 82.

Publications

 Gesichtspunkte eines Deutschen. Düsseldorf, Econ 1968
 Unterwegs – Woher und wohin? München, Droemer Knaur 1982
 Im Streit und umstritten. Anmerkungen zu Konrad Adenauer, Ludwig Erhard und den Ostverträgen. Berlin, Ullstein 1986
 Geschichten aus der Politik. Persönliches aus meinem Archiv. Berlin, Ullstein 1987
 Die Tür blieb offen – Ostverträge-Misstrauensvotum-Kanzlersturz. Bonn, Bouvier 1998, 
 Ein gewagtes Leben. Stuttgart, Hohenheim 2001,

Notes

References

Further reading

Michael F. Feldkamp (ed.), Der Bundestagspräsident. Amt - Funktion - Person. 16. Wahlperiode, München 2007, 

1924 births
2006 deaths
German World War II pilots
People from Braniewo
Christian Democratic Union of Germany politicians
Members of the Bundestag for North Rhine-Westphalia
Members of the Bundestag 1983–1987
Members of the Bundestag 1980–1983
Members of the Bundestag 1976–1980
Members of the Bundestag 1972–1976
Members of the Bundestag 1969–1972
Members of the Bundestag 1965–1969
Members of the Bundestag 1961–1965
Members of the Bundestag 1957–1961
Federal government ministers of Germany
People from East Prussia
Presidents of the Bundestag
Grand Crosses 1st class of the Order of Merit of the Federal Republic of Germany